The 2020 Ivy League women's basketball tournament was scheduled to be the women's college conference tournament held March 13 and 14, 2020, at the Lavietes Pavilion on the campus of Harvard University in Boston. The winner was to earn the Ivy League's automatic bid to the 2020 NCAA tournament. On March 10, 2020, the Ivy League announced it had cancelled the tournament due to the COVID-19 pandemic. As a result of winning the regular season title, Princeton was named the Ivy League's automatic qualifier for the NCAA Tournament.

Seeds
Only the top four teams in the 2019–20 Ivy League regular-season standings were to participate in the tournament and be seeded according to their records in conference play, resulting in a Shaughnessy playoff.

Footnotes

References

 

Tournament
Ivy League women's basketball tournament
Ivy League women's basketball tournament
Basketball competitions in Boston
College sports tournaments in Massachusetts
Ivy League women's basketball tournament
Ivy League women's basketball tournament
Women's sports in Massachusetts